Dropped is the fifth full-length album by industrial/hip hop artists Consolidated, which was released in 1998 by G7 Welcoming Committee.  The title is an allusion to the band having been "dropped" by London Records because of poor album sales as well as a general reference to men having "dropped the ball" in their relationships.

According to Chris Hannah, one of the founding members of the G7 Welcoming Committee record label, Adam Sherburne contacted the fledgling label after seeing an ad in the pages of Z Magazine and requested that they release the album.

Track listing

References

1998 albums
Consolidated (band) albums
G7 Welcoming Committee Records albums